The 2002 FIA GT Anderstorp 500 km was the fifth round the 2002 FIA GT Championship season.  It took place at the Scandinavian Raceway, Sweden, on 30 June 2002.

Official results
Class winners in bold.  Cars failing to complete 70% of winner's distance marked as Not Classified (NC).

Statistics
 Pole position – #14 Lister Storm Racing – 1:30.601
 Fastest lap – #23 BMS Scuderia Italia – 1:41.603
 Average speed – 111.900 km/h

References

 
 
 

A
FIA GT